Breaking In may refer to:

Breaking In (1989 film), an American crime comedy
Breaking In (2018 film), an American thriller
Breaking In (TV series), a sitcom